The Shangri-La Hotel, Tokyo is a luxury hotel located in the Tokyo Station complex in Chiyoda, Tokyo, Japan.

History 
The Shangri-La Hotel, Tokyo, was opened on March 2, 2009. It was the first property in Japan from Hong Kong-based Shangri-La Hotels and Resorts. The hotel has 200 guestrooms and suites occupying 11 floors of the Mori-built Marunouchi Trust Tower Main.
Most of the hotel's interior was designed by the Santa Monica-based Hirsch Bedner Associates, whereas select rooms, restaurants, and the hotel's club lounge was designed by Andre Fu of the Hong Kong-based AFSO.

Notable events
In 2011, the hotel hosted a charity concert of the Leipzig String Quartet for the victims of the 2011 Tōhoku earthquake and tsunami. It also hosted the Jacksons, Macy Gray and A.I. for an after-party live event for the Michael Jackson Tribute Show in December 2011.

Awards

 Best New Business Hotel Award - 'Wallpaper magazine (2009)
 Best Luxury Hotel in the World - TripAdvisor's Travelers' Choice Award (2012, 2014)

References

External links

 

Hotels established in 2009
Marunouchi
Shangri-La Hotels and Resorts
Skyscraper hotels in Tokyo
Buildings and structures in Chiyoda, Tokyo
2009 establishments in Japan